Claire Arthur Alexander or Arthur Claire Alexander (born June 16, 1945) is a Canadian former professional ice hockey player who played in the National Hockey League (NHL) and World Hockey Association (WHA) in the 1970s.

Playing career
After a brief stint in minor-pro hockey in the mid-1960s, he returned home to Ontario and took a job as a milkman, with Silverwood Dairies while continuing to star with local senior amateur teams. A skilled defender with a booming shot, Alexander led the Orillia Terriers to the Allan Cup, awarded to Canada's top amateur club, in 1973.

The Toronto Maple Leafs talked Alexander into giving pro hockey another chance, and he joined their Central Hockey League (CHL) affiliate, the Oklahoma City Blazers the following year. He was an immediate hit, as he scored 60 points and was named the league's top rookie and top defender.

In 1974–75, Alexander was called up to the Leafs, making his NHL debut at the age of 29. He finished the season with 7 goals (including a hat-trick) and 17 points in 42 games. He spent most of the next two seasons on the Leafs' roster, posting 21 points in 81 games, and made his most notable contribution in the 1976 playoffs with 6 points in 9 games. Thanks to his former milkman past he was known as "The Milkman" during his Leafs' days.

For 1977–78, Alexander was traded to the Vancouver Canucks. He split the season between the Canucks and their farm team in the CHL, the Tulsa Oilers, but made a substantial contribution with 26 points in just 32 games in Vancouver. The following season, he moved to the World Hockey Association (WHA) with the Edmonton Oilers, posting 31 points on a team featuring Wayne Gretzky in his first professional season. He then spent two seasons playing in Germany and one season in Switzerland before retiring in 1982. Following his retirement he served a brief stint as head coach of Toronto's American Hockey League (AHL) affiliate in St. Catharines.

Alexander finished his career with 18 goals and 64 points in 155 career NHL games, along with just 36 penalty minutes. He also recorded 8 goals and 31 points in 54 WHA games.

His daughter Buffy-Lynne Williams has represented Canada in rowing in international competition, including three consecutive Summer Olympics, from 2000 to 2008.

Career statistics

Regular season and playoffs

See also
 List of Toronto Maple Leafs players

References

External links

1945 births
Living people
Canadian ice hockey defencemen
Dallas Black Hawks players
Edmonton Oilers (WHA) players
Kitchener Rangers players
Oklahoma City Blazers (1965–1977) players
Rote Teufel Bad Nauheim players
Toronto Maple Leafs players
Tulsa Oilers (1964–1984) players
Vancouver Canucks players
ZSC Lions players
Ice hockey people from Simcoe County
Sportspeople from Collingwood, Ontario
Canadian expatriate ice hockey players in Germany
Canadian expatriate ice hockey players in the United States